Manipuri calendar may refer to:
 Meitei calendar, the traditional calendar of the Meitei people based on traditional Meitei religion (Sanamahism) 
 Regional system of the Hindu calendar as used by the Hindus in Manipur